The Assessed Taxes Act 1840 is an Act of Parliament passed in Victorian England.  The abridgement of the Act is shown dated 29 July 1839; the previous Act expired on 5 April the following year.  The Act was amended again in 1841, 1845, 1851 and 1854.

References 

United Kingdom Acts of Parliament 1840